This is a list of subsidiaries owned by ABS-CBN Corporation, a Philippine media and entertainment conglomerate based in Quezon City. This also includes business segments that are owned and operated by the company including its blocktime agreements with other television networks like ZOE Broadcasting Network (A2Z) and TV5.

Subsidiaries

Affiliates
Here is a list of companies where ABS-CBN holds economic interest:

Corporate social responsibility
 ABS-CBN Foundation, Inc.
 ABS-CBN Bayan Foundation, Inc.
 71 Dreams Foundation, Inc.

Defunct subsidiaries
ABS-CBN Consumer Products, Inc. (consumer products)
ABS-CBN Europe Societa Per Azioni (financial services)
ABS-CBN Interactive, Inc. (online and interactive media)
ABS-CBN Hong Kong, Ltd. (services)
ABS-CBN Multimedia, Inc. (online video games distribution and publishing) 
Cinemagica, Inc. (theatrical and amusement services)
Culinary Publications, Inc. (print publishing, merged to ABS-CBN Publishing, Inc.)
Creative Creatures, Inc. (services - creature effects, makeup, prosthetic, props, puppetry)
Hong Kong Club, Ltd.
Pinoy Auctions (auction website)
Shopping Network, Inc. (consumer products)
Roadrunner Network, Inc. (post production, merged to ABS-CBN Film Productions, inc.)
Sky Films, Inc. (foreign film distribution)
 Star Recording, Inc. (music recording, merged to ABS-CBN Film Productions, Inc.)
Star Songs, Inc. (music publishing, merged to ABS-CBN Film Productions, Inc.)
Studio 23, Inc. (content development and distribution)

Former affiliations
AMCARA Broadcasting Network (broadcasting) - sold its 49% stake to Rodrigo V. Carandang in 2019.

Business segments
ABS-CBN reports its business into several categories or business segments. Listed below are the active products and services operating under these segments (including blocktime agreements with other television networks):

TV and studio

Broadcast
A2Z
TV5
Kapamilya Channel
TeleRadyo
MOR Entertainment

Global
ANC Global
Cinema One
TeleRadyo Global
MOR Entertainment
MyxRadio
Myx TV
San Francisco International Gateway
The Filipino Channel (TFC)
TFC.tv
TFC IPTV On Demand
TFC PPV

Films and music
ABS-CBN Film Productions
Skylight Films
Black Sheep
Tarsier Records
Star Creatives Group (Star Cinema, Star Events, Star Home Video, Star Music, Star Creatives TV)
Star Cinema Productions (50%)

Niche market
A2Z
ANC (ANC HD)
ABS-CBN Publishing
Creative Programs (Cinema One, Cine Mo!, Jeepney TV, Metro Channel, Myx)
DZMM TeleRadyo
Kapamilya Channel (Kapamilya Channel HD)
Knowledge Channel

Pay television
Destiny Cable 
Sky Cable
Cignal
Sky On Demand
Sky PPV

New business
ABS-CBN Mobile
ABS-CBN TV Plus
A2Z Channel 11
Chicken Pork Adobo
Kakao (Philippines) 50% 
KidZania Manila (73%)
NoInk
O Shopping (50%)
One Music PH
Sky Mobi

Others
ABS-CBN Digital Media
ABS-CBNnews.com
iWant TFC
ABS-CBN Film Archives
ABS-CBN News
ABS-CBN Philharmonic Orchestra (50%)
ABS-CBN Store
Dreamscape Entertainment Television
Restaurant 9501
San Francisco International Gateway
Sky Broadband
Sky Zone
Star Magic
Teatro Kapamilya
Polaris Artists
Rise Artists Studio

Notes

References

External links
www.abs-cbn.com
corporate.abs-cbn.com

Assets
ABS-CBN
 
ABS-CBN
 
Asset lists